The eBay stalking scandal was a campaign conducted in 2019 by eBay employees and contractors. The scandal involved the aggressive stalking and harassment of two e-commerce bloggers, Ina and David Steiner, who wrote frequent commentary about eBay on their website EcommerceBytes.  Seven employees pleaded guilty to charges involving criminal conspiracies.  The accused employees included two members of eBay’s executive leadership team.

EcommerceBytes
EcommerceBytes was founded in 1999, four years after eBay was founded. Initially called AuctionBytes, the website offered advice to buyers in the early days of internet commerce. In the years after its founding, the website became a resource for sellers on a number of platforms, from Etsy to Amazon, a kind of trade publication for anyone whose business is selling items online.  It is read primarily by sellers, but also by some corporate staff, including some who posted comments on their website. The website not only offers advice, but also critiques of the corporate and policy changes at eBay and other e-commerce platforms.  For example, in April 2019, Ina Steiner reported there that eBay's then-CEO Devin Wenig was paid 152 times more than the typical eBay employee.

Activist Investor Requests Changes

In January 2019, Elliott Management, an activist hedge fund, purchased a significant investment in eBay. They sent a letter to its board of directors requesting changes, such as replacing the CEO, saying that eBay "as a public-company investment has underperformed both its peers and the market for a prolonged period of time." This was interpreted as placing additional demands on eBay management to produce results, leading to an atmosphere of heightened stress throughout the company.

EcommerceBytes was not the only source of criticism; Wenig was also concerned about a Twitter account named Fidomaster.  (The Steiners had no connection to or knowledge of this Twitter user.)

Stalking and harassment 
Members of eBay's executive leadership had long been bothered by the couple's posts. Under pressure in early 2019 to enhance performance, the company felt a new sense of urgency.  For example, in April 2019, Wenig sent the post about how outsized his compensation was compared to typical employees to eBay’s chief communications officer at the time, Steve Wymer.  Wymer replied that eBay was "going to crush this lady." Wenig texted Wymer weeks later: "Take her down."  Wymer took their concerns to the head of eBay's security division, Jim Baugh, whose team began harassing the Steiners at home and online. Wymer texted Baugh that Ina Steiner was a "biased troll who needs to be BURNED DOWN;" that he wants "to see ashes;" and that Baugh should do "whatever it takes."

The Steiners were harassed and threatened both online and physically in their home by deliveries of such things as a bloody pig mask, live cockroaches and spiders, a funeral wreath, and large orders of pizza. Pornographic magazines with David Steiner’s name on them were sent to a neighbor’s house.

Employees flew from California to Boston so they could vandalize the couple's Natick, Massachusetts home as well as stalk their personal vehicle. Plans were even made to break into the couple's garage and place a GPS tracker on their car.

Criminal Charges 

In June 2020, the U.S. Department of Justice charged six former eBay employees and contractors with conspiracy to commit cyberstalking and conspiracy to tamper with witnesses; a seventh former employee was charged in July.

Two former employees were charged and arrested. They are:

 James Baugh of San Jose, California. He was eBay's Senior Director of Safety & Security.  Baugh pleaded guilty in April 2022. In September 2022, Baugh was sentenced to 57 months in prison.
 David Harville of New York City. He was eBay's former Director of Global Resiliency. Harville pleaded guilty to his participation in the harassment in May 2022. In September 2022 Harville was sentenced to 24 months in prison.

Five former employees were charged but not arrested. Each of these individuals was charged with conspiracy to commit cyberstalking and conspiracy to tamper with witnesses.  All of them pleaded guilty to the charges.  They are:

 Stephanie Popp of San Jose, California. She was formerly eBay's Senior Manager of Global Intelligence.  She pleaded guilty in October 2020. In October of 2022, Popp was sentenced to 13 months in prison. 
 Stephanie Stockwell of Redwood City, California. She was formerly the manager of eBay's Global Intelligence Center (GIC).  She pleaded guilty in October 2020. In October 2022 Stockwell was sentenced to 24 months of probation.
 Veronica Zea of San Jose, California. She had served as an eBay contractor working as an intelligence analyst in the GIC.  She pleaded guilty in October 2020.
 Brian Gilbert of San Jose, California. A former police captain, he had been a Senior Manager of Special Operations for eBay's Global Security Team.  He pleaded guilty to conspiring to commit cyberstalking and conspiring to tamper with a witness in October 2020.
 Philip Cooke of San Jose, California. He was charged in July 2020, in distinction to the others, who were all charged on June 15, 2020. He was a supervisor of security operations. Cooke had formerly worked as a police captain in Santa Clara. He pleaded guilty in October 2020 and was sentenced to 18 months in federal prison, followed by 3 years of supervised release (including 12 months of house arrest), on July 27, 2021.

Civil lawsuit 

In July 2021, Ina and David Steiner filed suit against eBay Inc.; former CEO Davin Wenig; former Chief Communications Officer, Steve Wymer; the seven defendants in the criminal case and Progressive F.O.R.C.E Concepts (PFC), an independent security firm. 

The lawsuit claims that Wenig and Wymer "provided the other Defendants with carte blanche authority to terminate the reporting of the Steiners by whatever means necessary, with Defendant Wymer expressing '... I want to see ashes. As long as it takes. Whatever it takes.' Defendant Wymer promised the defendants he would 'embrace managing any bad fallout' if the plan went south, further directing, 'We need to STOP her.' All of the horrific, vicious and sickening conduct that followed was committed by employees of eBay and PFC, while acting in the scope of their employment under the authority of and for the benefit of eBay and PFC."

Internal corporate investigation 
After being contacted by law enforcement, eBay hired a law firm to investigate the harassment.  The investigation concluded in September 2019, and all of the people charged with crimes plus the chief communications officer Steve Wymer were fired.  The investigation found that neither Wenig nor Wymer "directed or knew that criminal acts would follow." Wymer was hired the next year as the head of a local branch of the Boys & Girls Clubs of America, a children's charity that knew about Wymer's involvement in the harassment scandal.

The CEO Wenig's messages were deemed "inappropriate" by eBay, but eBay's internal investigation concluded that the CEO did not know about the stalking and harassment activities.  Wenig left eBay in September 2019, with a US$57 million severance package.  After the harassment scandal became news, Wenig was re-elected to the board of General Motors.

References

External links
 ecommercebytes.com

Corporate scandals
Corporate crime
2019 scandals